In probability theory, the continuous mapping theorem states that continuous functions preserve limits even if their arguments are sequences of random variables. A continuous function, in Heine’s definition, is such a function that maps convergent sequences into convergent sequences: if xn → x then g(xn) → g(x). The continuous mapping theorem states that this will also be true if we replace the deterministic sequence {xn} with a sequence of random variables {Xn}, and replace the standard notion of convergence of real numbers “→” with one of the types of convergence of random variables.

This theorem was first proved by Henry Mann and Abraham Wald in 1943, and it is therefore sometimes called the Mann–Wald theorem. Meanwhile, Denis Sargan refers to it as the general transformation theorem.

Statement
Let {Xn}, X be random elements defined on a metric space S. Suppose a function  (where S′ is another metric space) has the set of discontinuity points Dg such that . Then

 
where the superscripts, "d", "p", and "a.s." denote convergence in distribution, convergence in probability, and almost sure convergence respectively.

Proof
This proof has been adopted from 

Spaces S and S′ are equipped with certain metrics. For simplicity we will denote both of these metrics using the |x − y| notation, even though the metrics may be arbitrary and not necessarily Euclidean.

Convergence in distribution
We will need a particular statement from the portmanteau theorem: that convergence in distribution  is equivalent to
  for every bounded continuous functional f.

So it suffices to prove that  for every bounded continuous functional f. Note that  is itself a bounded continuous functional. And so the claim follows from the statement above.

Convergence in probability
Fix an arbitrary ε > 0. Then for any δ > 0 consider the set Bδ defined as
 
This is the set of continuity points x of the function g(·) for which it is possible to find, within the δ-neighborhood of x, a point which maps outside the ε-neighborhood of g(x). By definition of continuity, this set shrinks as δ goes to zero, so that limδ → 0Bδ = ∅.

Now suppose that |g(X) − g(Xn)| > ε. This implies that at least one of the following is true: either |X−Xn| ≥ δ, or X ∈ Dg, or X∈Bδ. In terms of probabilities this can be written as
 

On the right-hand side, the first term converges to zero as n → ∞ for any fixed δ, by the definition of convergence in probability of the sequence {Xn}. The second term converges to zero as δ → 0, since the set Bδ shrinks to an empty set. And the last term is identically equal to zero by assumption of the theorem. Therefore, the conclusion is that
 
which means that g(Xn) converges to g(X) in probability.

Almost sure convergence 
By definition of the continuity of the function g(·),
 
at each point X(ω) where g(·) is continuous. Therefore,
 
because the intersection of two almost sure events is almost sure.

By definition, we conclude that g(Xn) converges to g(X) almost surely.

See also
 Slutsky's theorem
 Portmanteau theorem
 Pushforward measure

References

Probability theorems
Theorems in statistics
Articles containing proofs